Monirul Haq Chowdhury is a Bangladesh Nationalist Party politician and the former Member of Parliament of Comilla-9.

Career
Chowdhury was elected to parliament from Comilla-9 as a Bangladesh Nationalist Party candidate in 2001.

References

Living people
People from Comilla District
Bangladesh Nationalist Party politicians
Jatiya Party politicians
4th Jatiya Sangsad members
5th Jatiya Sangsad members
8th Jatiya Sangsad members
1946 births